The Venezuelan twelve-and-a-half-céntimo coin ( céntimos), was a cupro-nickel money and that was worth one-eighth of a silver Venezuelan Bolivar (VEB), this round piece of metal was known also with the very popular nicknames of "locha" or "cuartillo".

The Venezuelan Coinage Act of 31 March 1879, established the Bolivar as the official currency, one locha was equivalent in value to  bolívar,  centavos and  real; these coins were minted in Germany, the United States and Spain in the years 1896, 1925, 1927, 1929, 1936, 1938, 1944, 1945, 1946, 1948, 1958 and 1969; in 1971, cupronickel 10-céntimo coins were issued to replace the -céntimo coin which had last been issued in 1969. Rising inflation and hyperinflation depreciated the value of these coins in relation to the value of their make them up materials; this depreciation led to their eventual abandonment. None were made after the 1970s until 2007.

The last  céntimos coins were issued with a series of novel features since its last issuance by the monetary authority Central Bank of Venezuela (in Spanish BCV) since 2007 through 2018. They had a diameter of 23 mm and a thickness of 1.3 mm. Its composition was plated steel in nickel; the edge (outer edge) of these coins had an aesthetically smooth design.

These new series coins were affected depreciation too and they disappeared from the country's economy, after the currency redenomination of August 2018 and due to the hyperinflation that currently affects it.

For November 26, 2020, the exchange rate between the US dollar and the sovereign bolivar (VES) is as follows:

 At the Exchange-rate regime, US $1 is equivalent to Bs.S 926,916.9221

 At Exchange rate (Black market) US $1 is equivalent to Bs.S 1,015,000.00

For this reason, a Venezuelan citizen would have to hypothetically pay 8,120,000 lochas to buy one American dollar in the parallel Venezuelan currency market.

See also 
 Bolivar (currency)
 Central Bank of Venezuela
 Venezuelan bolívar
 Hard bolívar
 Céntimo

References

Coins